Charles Ion Carr Bosanquet (19 April 1903 – 9 April 1986) was a Vicechancellor of Durham University, and the first Vice-chancellor of Newcastle University.

Career

Bosanquet was born on 19 April 1903 in Athens, where his father, Robert Carr Bosanquet, was Director of the British School of Archaeology. He was educated at Winchester College and Trinity College, Cambridge, from which he graduated in 1925 with a first class honours degree in History. For two years he worked as a journalist for the Financial News, then moved to the merchant bank Lazard Brothers in the City of London. Following the outbreak of the Second World War, he joined the Civil Service, and was a Principal Assistant Secretary in the Ministry of Agriculture from 1941 to 1945.

In 1945, Bosanquet became Treasurer of Christ Church, Oxford. He was appointed Vicechancellor of Durham University in 1952, and held this position in alternation with James F. Duff until 1960. From 1952 onwards, he was also Rector of King's College in Newcastle upon Tyne, which at the time was part of Durham University. Bosanquet played an important role in steering the college towards its independence in 1963, when he became Vicechancellor of the newly-created Newcastle University. In that role, on 13 November 1967, he welcomed Martin Luther King Jr. to the University, presenting him with a Doctor of Civil Law degree.

Bosanquet played a key role in the development of institution's Department of Archaeology, and both he and his wife were also deeply involved with student welfare. Between 11 March 1948 and 4th March 1949, he acted as High Sheriff of Northumberland.

Personal life
In January 1931, Bosanquet married Barbara Schieffelin (1906–1987) of Park Avenue, New York, who was a direct descendant of US founding father John Jay and American business magnate Cornelius Vanderbilt. His cousin, William Bosanquet, was married to Esther Cleveland, daughter of US President Grover Cleveland.

Both the Bosanquet and Schieffelin families were of Huguenot descent, the family seat of the Bosanquets being at Rock, near Alnwick, Northumberland. Bosanquet lived at Rock Moor House, and leased Rock Hall to the Youth Hostel Association for a term of 30 years in 1950. In 1952, he was reported to be actively engaged in farming on the estate, and had exhibited sheep at local agricultural shows.

Bosanquet died on 9 April 1986, and a memorial service was held on 3 October of that year at the Church of St Thomas the Martyr, Newcastle. He is buried with his wife at the Church of St. Philip and St. James in Rock. A stained glass window in the church commemorates Bosanquet's parents as well as the couple themselves, who had a son and three daughters.

See also

 Bernard Bosanquet (philosopher)

 Charles Bosanquet (1759–1850)

 Admiral Sir Day Hort Bosanquet

Notes

References

External links
 Portrait of Bosanquet by Ruskin Spear on the Art UK website.

Vice-Chancellors of Newcastle University
1903 births
1986 deaths
High Sheriffs of Northumberland
People educated at Winchester College
Alumni of Trinity College, Cambridge